Cochlicopa, whose species are known as pillar snails, is a genus of small air-breathing land snails, terrestrial pulmonate gastropod mollusks in the family Cochlicopidae. 

This genus is prevalent in the Northern Hemisphere across the United States, Mexico and Europe. These snails feed mostly on plant matter, detritus and fungi.

Species 
Species in the genus Cochlicopa include:
 † Cochlicopa allixi (Cossmann, 1907) 
 † Cochlicopa aurelianensis (Deshayes, 1863) 
 † Cochlicopa brevis (Michaud, 1862) 
 Cochlicopa davidis (Ancey, 1882)
 † Cochlicopa dormitzeri (Reuss in Reuss & Meyer, 1849) 
 † Cochlicopa fassabortoloi Harzhauser, Neubauer & Esu in Harzhauser et al., 2015 
 † Cochlicopa formicina (F. Sandberger, 1871) 
 Cochlicopa hachijoensis Pilsbry, 1902
 † Cochlicopa headonensis Newton & G. F. Harris, 1894 
 † Cochlicopa laevissima (Michaud, 1862) 
 Cochlicopa lubrica (O. F. Müller, 1774) - glossy pillar
 Cochlicopa lubricella (Porro, 1838) - thin pillar
 † Cochlicopa macrostoma (O. Boettger, 1875) 
 † Cochlicopa milleri Wenz, 1919
 Cochlicopa morseana Doherty 1878 - Appalachian pillar
 Cochlicopa nitens  (M. von Gallenstein, 1848)- robust pillar
 † Cochlicopa procera Gottschick, 1920 
 Cochlicopa sinensis (Heude, 1890)
 † Cochlicopa splendens (A. Braun in Walchner, 1851)
 † Cochlicopa subcylindroides (Paladilhe, 1873)
Species brought into synonymy
 † Cochlicopa loxostoma (Klein, 1853): synonym of † Hypnophila loxostoma (Klein, 1853)  (new combination)
 Cochlicopa repentina Hudec, 1960: synonym of Cochlicopa lubrica (O. F. Müller, 1774)
 † Cochlicopa subrimata (Reuss in Reuss & Meyer, 1849) : synonym of † Hypnophila subrimata (Reuss in Reuss & Meyer, 1849) † (new combination)

References 

 Starobogatov, Ya.I. (1996). Eurasiatic species of the genus Cochlicopa (Gastropoda, Pulmonata, Cochlicopidae). Ruthenica, 5 (2): 105-129. Moskva.
 Bank, R. A. (2017). Classification of the Recent terrestrial Gastropoda of the World. Last update: July 16th, 2017

External links
 Férussac, A.E.J.P.F. d'Audebard de. (1821-1822). Tableaux systématiques des animaux mollusques classés en familles naturelles, dans lesquels on a établi la concordance de tous les systèmes; suivis d'un Prodrome général pour tous les mollusques ou fluviatiles, vivantes ou fossiles. Paris, 1821 et 1822. Livraison 9: 1-24 (Quarto edition) [Folio edition: 1-32 (6-IV-1821); livr. 10: 25-48 (Quarto) [Folio: 33-56] (26-V-1821); livr. 11: 49-72 (Quarto) [Folio: 57-76] (13-VII-1821); livr. 12: 73-88 (Quarto) [Folio: 77-92] (21-IX-1821); livr. 13: 89-110 (Quarto) [Folio: 93-114] (10-XI-1821); livr. 14: i-xxiv (Quarto) (16-II-1822); livr. 15: xxv-xlvii[i] (Quarto) (13-IV-1822); livr. 16: 1-27 (Quarto) (16-VII-1822). – Paris / London (Arthus Bertrand / G.B. Sowerby)]
 Jeffreys, J. G. (1830). A synopsis of the testaceous pneumonobranchous Mollusca of Great Britain. Transactions of the Linnean Society of London. 16: 323-392
 Turton, W. (1831). A manual of the land and fresh-water shells of the British Islands, arranged according to the more modern system of classification; and described from perfect specimens in the author's cabinet: with coloured plates of every species, viii + 152 + 16 pp.): Index of English names), 9 unnumbered plates. London (Longman, Rees, Orme, Brown, & Green)

Cochlicopidae
Taxonomy articles created by Polbot